The 1954 Milan–San Remo was the 45th edition of the Milan–San Remo cycle race and was held on 19 March 1954. The race started in Milan and finished in San Remo. The race was won by Rik Van Steenbergen.

General classification

References

1954
1954 in road cycling
1954 in Italian sport
1954 Challenge Desgrange-Colombo
March 1954 sports events in Europe